Philip J. Finnegan (June 25, 1886 – January 4, 1959) was a United States circuit judge of the United States Court of Appeals for the Seventh Circuit.

Education and career

Born in Chicago, Illinois, Finnegan received a J.D. from the University of Chicago Law School in 1913 and entered private practice in Chicago. He was a Judge of the Municipal Court of Chicago from 1922 to 1929, and of the Circuit Court of Cook County, Illinois from 1929 to 1949.

Federal judicial service

Finnegan was nominated by President Harry S. Truman on April 8, 1949, to a seat on the United States Court of Appeals for the Seventh Circuit vacated by Judge William Morris Sparks. He was confirmed by the United States Senate on May 3, 1949, and received his commission on May 5, 1949. His service terminated on January 4, 1959, due to his death.

References

Sources
 

1886 births
1959 deaths
Illinois state court judges
Judges of the United States Court of Appeals for the Seventh Circuit
United States court of appeals judges appointed by Harry S. Truman
20th-century American judges